Xiong Zi (born ) is a Chinese female volleyball player, playing as an outside hitter. She was part of the China women's national volleyball team.

She participated in the 2002 FIVB Volleyball Women's World Championship. 
She won the gold medal at the 2002 Asian Games. 
She competed in Beach Volleyball, at the 2000 Summer Olympics.

On club level she played for Sichuan in 2002.

References

External links 
 Player info FIVB
 Player info CEV
 
 Xiong Zi at Sports Reference
 http://www.bvbinfo.com/Player.asp?ID=1291

1979 births
Living people
Chinese female beach volleyball players
Volleyball players at the 2002 Asian Games
Medalists at the 2002 Asian Games
Place of birth missing (living people)
Asian Games medalists in volleyball
Asian Games gold medalists for China
Beach volleyball players at the 2000 Summer Olympics
Olympic beach volleyball players of China
Outside hitters